Dark Bird Is Home is the fourth LP by The Tallest Man on Earth. It was released on CD, digital and vinyl on May 12, 2015 through the label Dead Oceans. The album is the first in his discography to feature a full band playing on almost every track.

Background 
The songs of the album were recorded in various countries, studios, and barns, and are said to "carry a weather-worn quality, some dirt and some grit." BJ Burton announced via his Instagram page that production on the album had begun in July 2014 and concluded in September 2014. The album is said to be Matsson's most personal and direct piece of work, inspired by the death of a close family member and by the divorce from his wife, singer-songwriter Amanda Bergman. A trailer for the album was released on February 10, 2015, with Matsson proclaiming that "this is not the end, this is fine".

Critical reception

Dark Bird Is Home received positive reviews from most music critics. At Metacritic, which assigns a normalized rating out of 100 to reviews from mainstream critics, the album received an average score of 75, based on 21 reviews, which indicates "generally favorable reviews".

Commercial performance
The album debuted in the United States at No. 1 on Folk Albums, No. 8 on Top Rock Albums, and No. 67 on Billboard 200, with 8,000 sold in its first week.

Track listing

Personnel
 Kristian Matsson – banjo, bass guitar, clarinet, drums, acoustic guitar, electric guitar, harmonica, alto horn, omnichord, pedal steel guitar, percussion, piano, synthesizer, tape machine, tom-tom drum, vocals, backup vocals
 Oskar Bond – piano
BJ Burton – engineer, mixing, producer
 C.J. Camerieri – french horn, trumpet
 Bird Coulter – piano
 Dan Huiting – bass guitar
 Mike Lewis – bass guitar, piano, soprano saxophone, saxophone, synthesizer
 Huntley Miller – mastering
 Niclas Nordin – drums, percussion
 Mike Noyce – electric guitar, viola, violin, vocals, backup vocals
 Mats Winkvist – bass guitar
 Cameron Wittig – photography

Charts

References 

2015 albums
The Tallest Man on Earth albums
Dead Oceans albums